The Biedenkopf transmitter is a transmission tower owned by the Hessischer Rundfunk. It is located on the 673 meters (2,208 ft) high Sackpfeife mountain near the city of Biedenkopf in Hesse, just a few meters away from the border to North Rhine-Westphalia. It is used for radio and formerly TV broadcasting.

Because of the close proximity to North Rhine-Westphalia, the facility is also used by the Westdeutscher Rundfunk to cover certain valleys which cannot be reached by either Ederkopf transmitter or Nordhelle transmitter. However, the signals are transmitted omnidirectionally and so cover large parts of Hesse as well.

The transmitter was first constructed in 1953 as a steel tube pylon. This was replaced in 1982 by a 210 meters high guyed lattice tower.

Coverage
The Biedenkopf transmitter covers mostly the very mountainous region around the cities of Waldeck and Frankenberg to the north, as well as the area to the south up to the city of Limburg an der Lahn. It also happens to reach far into the east and south-east direction including Frankfurt am Main. The signals don't reach into the west at all because of the unsuitable geography, and the Taunus mountain range restricts the range to the south.

Channels
Analog radio:
hr1 - 91.0 MHz (100 kW)
hr2 - 99.6 MHz (100 kW)
hr3 - 87.6 MHz (100 kW)
hr4 - 104.3 MHz (100 kW)
hr-info - 102.3 MHz (10 kW)
WDR 2 - 92.3 MHz (15 kW)
WDR 3 - 88.7 MHz (15 kW)
Analog television (no longer on air)
VHF 2 - ARD (100 kW)

The 102,3 MHz frequency originally transmitted hr4 as well, but with a different regionalization. This was considered superfluous, so the frequency was redelegated to the news radio station hr-info. However, because it still transmits primarily in the north-east direction, it can hardly be heard in the main populated cities.

The Biedenkopf transmitter was one of the few transmitters in Germany to use the Band I for TV broadcasting. It is not used for digital television, however, signals may be received from the Angelburg transmitter.

References

Radio masts and towers in Germany
Communication towers in Germany
1953 establishments in West Germany
Towers completed in 1953